Alexander David Harris (born 31 August 1994) is a Scottish professional footballer who plays as a winger for Berwick Rangers.

Club career
Born in Edinburgh, Harris attended Edinburgh Academy and played for the Civil Service Strollers under-12 team, alongside future Hibernian teammate Danny Handling. He made his first-team debut on 6 October 2012, as an 88th-minute substitute in a 3–0 home win against Dundee. Hibernian came from 3–0 down at half-time to win 4–3 in a 2012–13 Scottish Cup semi-final against Falkirk, as Harris scored the team's first goal and assisted the second.

He missed most of the first half of the 2013–14 season due to an ankle injury. After returning to the Hibernian first team in January 2014, Harris signed a new contract with the club, tying him to the club until June 2017.

Harris moved on loan to Scottish Premiership club Dundee on 3 January 2015, in exchange for Martin Boyle. He scored his first goal for Dundee on 10 January, with a deflected shot in the third minute of a 4–1 home win against Motherwell.

Harris joined Scottish Championship club Queen of the South on 21 August 2015 on loan for the rest of the 2015–16 season. He returned to Hibernian for the 2016–17 season, but was again affected by injury. Harris left the club during the 2017 close season, at the end of his contract. Harris signed a two-year contract with Falkirk on 19 June 2017. He left the club on 31 August 2018 when his contract was cancelled by mutual consent.

Harris signed for National League North club York City on 20 September 2018. He was released at the end of the 2018–19 season.

Harris signed for Scottish League Two club Edinburgh City on 20 June 2019.

Berwick Rangers announced the signing of Harris in the summer of 2021.

International career
Harris was selected for the Scotland national under-19 team in August 2012. He made his debut on 23 August, as a 55th-minute substitute in a 2–1 away defeat to Norway in a friendly. He made his first start two days later in what proved to be his final international appearance, as Scotland again lost away to Norway, this time 3–2.

Personal life
Harris is the great-great-nephew of former Hibernian, Everton and Scotland player Jimmy Dunn.

Career statistics

Honours
Hibernian
Scottish Cup runner-up: 2012–13

References

External links

Profile at the Edinburgh City F.C. website
Profile at the Scottish Football Association website

1994 births
Living people
Footballers from Edinburgh
Scottish footballers
Scotland youth international footballers
Association football wingers
Hibernian F.C. players
Dundee F.C. players
Queen of the South F.C. players
Falkirk F.C. players
York City F.C. players
F.C. Edinburgh players
Scottish Premier League players
Scottish Professional Football League players
National League (English football) players
People educated at Edinburgh Academy
Civil Service Strollers F.C players
Berwick Rangers F.C. players
Lowland Football League players